Truppach may refer to:

Truppach (Mistelgau), a district of Mistelgau, Bavaria, Germany
Truppach (Wiesent), a river of Bavaria, Germany, tributary of the Wiesent